William F. Etter (born February 18, 1950) is a former American football quarterback.  He was an All-American at Lewis and Clark High School in Spokane; a two-game starter for the University of Notre Dame until a knee injury ended his college career; and a three-year backup for the CFL's Hamilton Tiger-Cats, from 1973-1975.  He is currently a commercial and personal injury defense lawyer in Spokane.

Etter held the Notre Dame record for the most rushing yards by a quarterback in a single game—146 yards against the Naval Academy, accomplished as a backup to Joe Theismann in 1969.

References

1950 births
American football quarterbacks
Notre Dame Fighting Irish football players
Living people